The 1950 Kansas State Wildcats football team represented Kansas State University in the 1950 college football season. The team's head football coach was Ralph Graham, in his final year at the helm of the Wildcats. The Wildcats played their home games in Memorial Stadium. The Wildcats finished the season with a 1–9–1 record with a 0–6 record in conference play. They finished in last place in the Big Seven Conference.  The Wildcats scored 122 points and gave up 355 points.

Schedule

References

Kansas State
Kansas State Wildcats football seasons
Kansas State Wildcats football